Stingray is a British children's science fiction television series created by Gerry and Sylvia Anderson and produced by AP Films (APF) for ITC Entertainment. Filmed in 1963 using a combination of electronic marionette puppetry and scale model special effects, it was APF's sixth puppet series and the third to be produced under the banner of "Supermarionation". It premiered in October 1964 and ran for 39 half-hour episodes.

Set in the 2060s, the series follows the exploits of the World Aquanaut Security Patrol (WASP), an organisation responsible for policing the Earth's oceans. The WASP's flagship is Stingray, a combat submarine crewed by Captain Troy Tempest, navigator Lieutenant "Phones" and Marina, a mute young woman from under the sea. Stingrays adventures bring it into contact with various underwater civilisations, some friendly and others hostile, as well as strange natural phenomena.

In preparation for the series, APF acquired new, larger studios that it would continue to occupy for the remainder of the 1960s. Filmed at a cost of approximately £1 million, Stingray was the first British TV series (and Anderson's first) to be made entirely in colour, a move intended to increase its appeal to the lucrative American market. The underwater sequences were filmed "dry" by shooting the sets through thin aquaria, while surface shots were filmed on water tanks incorporating lowered back walls to create artificial horizons. Stingray was the first Supermarionation series whose puppet characters had interchangeable heads showing a range of facial expressions.

Stingray was originally broadcast on the ITV network in the United Kingdom and in syndication in North America. The series has drawn a largely positive response from commentators, some of whom have compared its premise to the Cold War.

Premise
Stingray, a nuclear-powered combat submarine, is the flagship of the World Aquanaut Security Patrol (WASP), a branch of the World Security Patrol (WSP) responsible for policing the Earth's oceans in the mid-2060s.

The WASP is based in the self-contained city of Marineville, located several miles inland somewhere on the West Coast of North America. It is connected to the Pacific Ocean via a tunnel leading to an "ocean door", through which Stingray is launched. General quarters alerts are sounded by rapid drumbeats played over the base's public address system. In emergency situations, the entire base can be lowered into underground bunkers via giant hydraulic jacks while fighter aircraft and interceptor missiles are launched to counter threats. WASP personnel acknowledge commands with the phrase "P.W.O.R." – short for "Proceeding With Orders Received".

Stingray is piloted by the square-jawed Captain Troy Tempest. He is paired with Southern navigator Lieutenant George Lee Sheridan, nicknamed "Phones" for his secondary role as Stingrays hydrophone operator. Troy and Phones board Stingray from the Marineville stand-by lounge by sitting on twin seats that are then lowered into the submarine via injector tubes. They answer to the "hoverchair"-bound Commander Sam Shore, whose daughter, Lieutenant Atlanta Shore, works in the Marineville control tower and is enamoured of Troy.

The series begins with the WASP's discovery that the ocean floor is home to many advanced civilisations. Among these is the undersea city of Titanica, ruled by King Titan. A despot, Titan commands the Aquaphibians, a warrior race who possess a fleet of lethal submersibles called "Mechanical Fish". In the first episode, Stingray is attacked by Titan's forces and Troy and Phones are captured. They are rescued by Titan's slave, Marina, a mute young woman from the undersea city of Pacifica who can breathe underwater. Marina defects to the WASP and becomes a permanent member of the Stingray crew. Troy becomes infatuated with her, making Atlanta jealous.

Furious at Marina's betrayal, Titan swears revenge on "terraneans" (land people) in general and Troy and the WASP in particular. However, his attempts to destroy Stingray and Marineville are always thwarted, often due to the incompetence of his henchman Surface Agent X-2-Zero. Titan's spy on land, X-2-Zero operates from the Pacific island of Lemoy, where he lives in an outwardly dilapidated house whose interior conceals vast banks of sophisticated surveillance and tracking equipment. Some episodes revolve around encounters with other races living under the sea or within the Earth (some friendly and others hostile), or investigation of natural phenomena. The final episode is a clip show in which Troy is named "Aquanaut of the Year" and past missions are recounted in flashback.

Episodes
Episodes are listed in the order of original broadcast in the ATV London region.

{{Episode table
|overall=
|title=
|director=
|writer=
|airdate=
|prodcode=
|airdateR=
|prodcodeR=
|episodes=

{{Episode list
|EpisodeNumber=39
|Title=Aquanaut of the Year
|DirectedBy=Alan Pattillo
|WrittenBy=Gerry and Sylvia Anderson
|OriginalAirDate=
|ProdCode=39
|ShortSummary=Named "Aquanaut of the Year", Troy sits before a live TV audience as a selection of his adventures are recalled as flashbacks.Clip show episode including flashbacks to "Emergency Marineville", "Raptures of the Deep" and "Subterranean Sea".
}}
}}

In a first for a Supermarionation series, Stingray included a Christmas episode, "A Christmas to Remember", and a clip show series finale, "Aquanaut of the Year". Before they could make "Aquanaut of the Year", APF required the approval of American TV producer Ralph Edwards, as the premise of the clip show borrows creative elements from Edwards' This Is Your Life. When correspondence with Edwards took longer than expected, work began on an alternative clip show in which the regular characters watch film recordings of some of Stingrays past missions. The filming of that episode was halted when APF was given permission to proceed with "Aquanaut of the Year".

Special episodes
APF subsequently used the framing material from the abandoned clip show to create a TV film called the "Feature Presentation". Written and directed by Alan Pattillo, this comprises four complete episodes and was privately screened for Japanese TV executives visiting the APF studio. It has never been broadcast on TV.

The framing material was rediscovered in late 2000 or early 2001 and later included on Stingray DVD releases.Archer and Hearn, p. 100. Several years later, BBC Wales and Granada International produced a condensed version of the Feature Presentation titled "The Reunion Party", which includes material from three episodes and was broadcast on BBC Four as part of a "Gerry Anderson Night" in 2008.

Compilation films
In the early 1980s, two Stingray compilation films were produced by ITC New York. These were made for American TV and later released on home video. They were televised as part of an ITC package branded "Super Space Theater", which also included compilations from other Supermarionation series. Each of the Stingray films consists of re-edited versions of four of the original episodes. The second film, Invaders from the Deep, was broadcast as the first episode of movie-mocking TV comedy series Mystery Science Theater 3000 in 1988.

Characters

WASP personnel and allies
 Captain Troy Tempest (voiced by Don Mason): pilot of the WASP's flagship submarine, Stingray.
 "Phones" (voiced by Robert Easton): a WASP lieutenant, Stingrays navigator and hydrophone operator, and Troy's best friend. His real name, George Lee Sheridan, is mentioned in the series' publicity material but never spoken on-screen.
 Marina: a young woman from under the sea who joins the Stingray crew. She was enslaved by King Titan of Titanica but defects to the WASP in the first episode and quickly becomes Troy's love interest. She can breathe in or out of water and is mute like the rest of her race.
 Commander Samuel Shore (voiced by Ray Barrett): head of Marineville. Paralysed from the waist down, he uses a hoverchair to move about. The cause of his disability is revealed in the episode "The Ghost of the Sea": as a security agent for an ocean mining platform, he was injured when the facility was attacked by a hostile submersible.
 Lieutenant Atlanta Shore (voiced by Lois Maxwell): Commander Shore's daughter, the assistant controller in Marineville Tower and Marina's rival for Troy's affections.
 Sub-Lieutenant John Horatio Fisher (voiced by Ray Barrett): the junior assistant controller in Marineville Tower. In "Rescue from the Skies" he is seen training to be an aquanaut.
 WSP Commanders (voiced by Don Mason, Ray Barrett, Robert Easton and David Graham): three commanders based at WSP Headquarters in Washington, D.C. They appear in various episodes to brief Commander Shore and other WASP personnel.
 Admiral Jack Denver (David Graham): president of the WASP underwater research division. He went to college with Commander Shore and enjoys debating with him.
 "Doc" (voiced by David Graham): Marineville's doctor. He appears in the episodes "The Master Plan" and "Invisible Enemy".
 Aphony: Marina's father, ruler of the peaceful underwater city of Pacifica. He appears in the episodes "Plant of Doom" and "Tune of Danger".
 Oink (voiced by David Graham): a seal pup that becomes Marina's pet after he saves the Stingray crew from a bomb in the episode "Sea of Oil".

Recurring villains
 King Titan (voiced by Ray Barrett): the tyrannical ruler of the underwater city of Titanica who wages war on the WASP.
 Surface Agent X-2-Zero (voiced by Robert Easton): Titan's inept agent on land, based in a dilapidated house on the Pacific island of Lemoy.
 The Aquaphibians (voiced by Robert Easton and David Graham): a race of undersea warriors who serve Titan. Their language resembles a series of gurgles.
 Teufel: Titan's pet, a large fish with supernatural powers that Titan keeps in a tank in his throne room and worships as a god.
 El Hudat and Abu (voiced by David Graham and Robert Easton) : the dictator of the island state of Hudatvia and his aide. They appear in the episodes "Star of the East" and "Eastern Eclipse".
 Grupa and Noctus (voiced by Ray Barrett and David Graham): a pair of undersea beings who appear in the episodes "A Nut for Marineville" and "Trapped in the Depths".

Production
In late 1962, as production on Fireball XL5 drew to a close, Gerry Anderson decided that an underwater series was the next logical step for production company AP Films (APF): "We had been on land and in space, so where could we go next? One possibility was underwater." He was inspired by childhood memories of U-boats in the Second World War, as well as by the mysteries of the ocean: "I was ... fascinated by trenches in the ocean that are as deep as mountains are high. There are features that man has never seen and pressures that are almost impossible to withstand. I began to wonder if there were areas of the Earth which had been little explored and felt justified in writing some wacky stuff."

APF's financial backer Lew Grade, who had bought the company after the success of Fireball XL5, approved the concept and commissioned 26 episodes. Anderson named the new series "Stingray" partly from a belief that stingrays are dangerous animals (in reality, they are docile), but also because it "seemed an exciting title." In preparation for the new series, APF, then based on the Slough Trading Estate's Ipswich Road, moved to a larger site on the nearby Stirling Road at a cost of £75,000.Archer and Hearn, p. 90. The new studios, built inside a converted factory unit, contained three  shooting stages: two for puppet filming and one for creating special effects. This arrangement allowed two episodes to be filmed simultaneously by separate crews.

Production began in spring or June 1963 and the series was completed in ten months. Each episode required an average of 11 days of puppet filming and five-and-a-half days of effects filming. The total cost of the production was approximately £1 million (£ million in ). The budget per episode was £20,000, which enabled APF, whose earlier productions had been in black and white, to film in Eastmancolor.The opening credits refer to the colour process as "Videcolor". Though Stingray would debut in black and white in its country of origin, the switch to colour filming was intended to increase the series' chances of being bought by a network in the US, where colour TV broadcasts were already common. Sets were re-painted after NBC supplied APF with a list of colours believed to cause problems such as flaring or bleeding; according to Anderson, this was unnecessary because when filmed in Eastmancolor, a set "would appear on screen exactly as you had painted it." Some colours were avoided as they did not come out well in black and white, and models and sets were painted differently to ensure that they did not blend into each other. During the production of Stingray, APF became the UK's largest colour film consumer.

As filming progressed, Grade extended his commission to 39 episodes. Around the time shooting on the final 13 episodes began, voice actors Don Mason and Robert Easton, who had understood that all members of the cast were on the same pay, learnt that they were in fact earning less than their co-star David Graham. They did not commit to the remaining episodes until their fees had been re-negotiated.

Characters and puppets
In her 2007 autobiography, Sylvia Anderson, who had voiced the regular characters of Jimmy Gibson in Supercar and Dr Venus in Fireball XL5, wrote that she devised Marina as a mute so that she could take a break from voice acting and "concentrate on the scripts and characters". Her voice parts in Stingray were limited to uncredited guest roles in the episodes "Raptures of the Deep" (as Marina) and "A Christmas to Remember".Bentley 2008, p. 93. Gerry Anderson said that Phones was inspired by memories of a sound engineer with whom he had once worked: "He spent so long with his headphones plugged in to various bits of equipment that he used to leave them on all the time, earning himself the nickname 'Phones'." Voice actor Robert Easton based the character's Southern American tones on his performance in the 1961 film Voyage to the Bottom of the Sea, in which he played a Southern radio operator. His voice for Surface Agent X-2-Zero was his impression of Peter Lorre, who had appeared in the same film. The Aquaphibians were voiced by Easton and Graham, their dialogue overlaid with a looped tape recording of bubbling water to create a gurgling effect.

The process of designing and making the puppets took four months and each of the main characters was sculpted in duplicate to allow episodes to be filmed in pairs. Some of the main characters were modelled on real-life actors; for example, Troy Tempest drew heavily on the looks of James Garner.Peel, p. 19. Gerry Anderson said that he did not explicitly instruct the sculptors to base Troy on this actor; instead, he named Garner simply to help them visualise the character, as he could see that they were struggling with his original brief (which merely called for Troy to be square-jawed and heroic-looking). Titan was based on a young Laurence Olivier, and Surface Agent X-2-Zero on either Claude RainsRogers et al., p. 75. or Peter Lorre. Atlanta Shore has been likened to Lois Maxwell (who voiced the character), while Marina has drawn comparisons to both Ursula AndressSellers, pp. 89–90. and Brigitte Bardot.Rogers et al., p. 53. The Aquaphibians were modelled on an alien creature from the Fireball XL5 episode "XL5 to H2O".Hearn, p. 39.Stingray was the first Supermarionation series to feature puppets with glass eyes and poseable hands for increased realism. To make the puppets' eyes sparkle in a lifelike way, they were polished with silicon and illuminated by a small lamp. Another innovation was the creation of alternative heads to allow characters to display emotions: besides their "normal" heads, which had neutral expressions, the main characters could also be fitted with "smiling" and "frowning" heads.Archer and Hearn, p. 94. The female puppets' wigs were made of human hair; for the male puppets, mohair was used as it was softer and easier to style.

Design and effects

The Stingray submarine was designed by Reg Hill and built by Feltham-based company Mastermodels. The Marineville model was built in-house from wood and cardboard supplemented with pieces of model kits bought from a toy shop. It was lowered and raised by hydraulics. Most of the series' special effects were filmed on high-speed cameras with the footage slowed down in post-production to convey a sense of greater weight and scale.

For the underwater sequences, Anderson had originally envisaged filming inside a water tank, but the cost of the specialist cameras and equipment required would have made this impractical. These scenes were ultimately filmed using a variation of a technique first used on Supercar: mounting a model ocean floor against a cyclorama and "flying" the puppets and miniature models across the set on wires from an overhead gantry, while shooting the action through a thin aquarium to distort the lighting. Vegetable dye was added to the aquarium to make the water more noticeable.Sellers, p. 91. Several aquaria were used; constructed by a company that supplied fish tanks to London Zoo, they were re-built with thicker glass after one of them burst from the water pressure. The move away from black and white sometimes caused problems as build-ups of algae in the aquaria caused the water to change colour.

The illusion of scenes being set underwater was further enhanced by populating the aquaria with tropical fish of various sizes to create forced perspective.Rogers et al., p. 83. Food was dropped at various points around the tanks to keep the animals in shot. A disc with various portions cut out was placed in front of an overhead lamp and rotated to give the impression of light being refracted through the ocean, while the water in the aquaria was disturbed to create "rippling" effects. Wires were painted over to make them non-reflective and fans were used to simulate currents passing over puppets' hair and clothing. For the climax of the Stingray launch sequence, in which the vessel shoots out of an underwater tunnel, part of the set was painted onto the aquarium to conceal the air line that produced the accompanying rush of bubbles.Meddings, p. 33.

Ocean surface shots in Supercar and Fireball XL5 had been filmed in an outdoor tank, but for Stingray several tanks were built inside the studio. Among the challenges presented by these shots was the need to make the scale models appear realistic while filming on water, which cannot be miniaturised. In a 1980 interview, Derek Meddings, the series' special effects director, described the process as "designing the shot carefully [...] then shoot[ing] it at very high speed (to make movement slower and therefore seemingly vaster) and hope you didn't get huge globules of water that would give the game away." Models were controlled using wires, poles and underwater tracks and rigs. To make the water look blue, the crew first tried experimenting with various lighting effects; these proved inadequate, so the water was dyed blue instead.La Rivière, p. 100. Various powders were used to create foam and whitewater.

Each tank incorporated an artificial horizon system whereby the back wall was built low and the tank was deliberately overfilled to create a waterfall, blurring the divide between the rim of the tank and the painted-sky backdrop.Hearn, p. 38. The effect was sustained by collecting the escaping water in troughs and pumping it back into the tank.Rogers et al., p. 84. To conserve studio space, some scenes were filmed in a wedge-shaped tank that was tailor-built to align with the camera's field of view. One of the effects shots in the series' opening titles shows Stingray and a pursuing Mechanical Fish leaping out of the ocean and then plunging back under water; although this required complex manoeuvring of the wired scale models that made the shot extremely difficult to film, in the end the effects crew succeeded on the first take.

Shots of aircraft in flight were filmed using a technique known as the "rolling sky", whereby the miniature models were positioned in front of a painted-sky canvas and remained static while an illusion of movement was created by running the background in a continuous loop around a pair of electrically-driven rollers. This system, devised by Meddings, made aerial shots easier to film as it took up very little studio space.

Opening and closing titles
The title sequence consists of a series of action shots featuring undersea explosions, Marineville going to red alert and Stingray doing battle with a Mechanical Fish. This is accompanied by dramatic narration from Commander Shore, who warns the audience to "Stand by for action!" before declaring that "Anything can happen in the next half-hour!" In the first 26 episodes, the title sequence opens in black and white before switching to colour; for the final 13 episodes, these first few seconds were replaced with all-colour footage.

Jim Sangster and Paul Condon, authors of Collins Telly Guide, praise the introduction, writing that "Of all the programmes we've looked at for this book, there is none with a title sequence as thrilling as Stingray." Anthony Clark of the British Film Institute calls the sequence "a mini-adventure in itself ... Children's TV had never before been this exciting." According to John Peel, the Stingray titles contrasted greatly with those of Fireball XL5 and Supercar, which were more "straight narrative openings". Peel also argues that Stingray influenced the "rapid cutting, pounding rhythms and extreme stylising" of later TV title sequences.

The series' closing titles focus on the love triangle between Troy, Marina and Atlanta. They feature Troy singing "Aqua Marina" about his feelings for Marina, performed by Gary Miller with soprano backing vocals – while Atlanta gazes wistfully at his photograph.

Broadcast and reception
In the UK, Stingray was first broadcast on 4 October 1964 in the Anglia, Border, Grampian, London and Southern regions. It premiered on Channel Television, ATV Midlands and Westward Television on 6 October and Granada Television on 30 December. First shown in black and white, it was broadcast in colour for the first time in December 1969. The series received little publicity but replicated the success of earlier Supermarionation productions. It was repeated on ITV in 1981 and on BBC2 in the early 1990s, with further repeats in the early 00s.Bentley 2017, p. 194.

In the US, the series was first shown in 1965. Premiering in colour, it was syndicated across more than 100 markets with sales exceeding £3 million.Rogers et al., p. 94. It ran on the Sci-Fi Channel in 1994 as part of the Cartoon Quest block.

In New Zealand, TVNZ screened the show during the mid-1980s in its weekend early morning kids block, along with a number of other Gerry Anderson shows from the 60s and 70s.

Critical response
Writing in 2006, Robert Sellers described Stingray as the "first truly classic Anderson show", whose special effects "have stood the test of time remarkably well." Daniel O'Brien, author of SF:UK: How British Science Fiction Changed the World, considers it to be "perhaps the archetypal Gerry Anderson series". Ranking the Anderson productions, Morgan Jeffery of Digital Spy places Stingray fourth, calling it "a kids' adventure serial of the highest order". Andrew Blair of Den of Geek believes that when grouped with Thunderbirds and Captain Scarlet and the Mysterons, Stingray is "the lesser of the Holy Triumvirate of Supermarionation [...] It's shorter than the former, and lighter than the latter, giving it a comparatively breezy feel." He also describes it as "inherently a matinee adventure, an inspiring rush of mild peril and jaunty escapades".

Comparing Stingray to the Andersons' earlier productions, media historian Marcus Hearn writes that the series essentially "[transfers] the format of Fireball XL5 to an underwater setting." Peel suggests that the decision to locate the action under the sea was influenced by the 1960s vogue for ocean exploration inspired by adventurers such as Jacques Cousteau and Thor Heyerdahl. Kim Newman describes Stingray as a "patrol show" in the same vein as Fireball XL5 and Supercar. Clark notes that Stingray, like its space-bound precursor, uses "some very simple elements – a four-square hero, a fantastic craft which lends its name to the show and a mix of fast-paced action and innocent humour." Despite praising Stingray, Peel considers Fireball XL5 and Thunderbirds to be more appealing. Peel also argues that of all Gerry Anderson's series, it is Stingray in which his preferred "tongue-in-cheek" style of humour is most prominent.

Mike Fillis of TV Zone magazine regards Stingray as less "ambitious" than Thunderbirds but compares its "self-awareness" favourably to the "po-faced rigidity" of Captain Scarlet. He also praises its "well-drawn" characters and describes the water-based special effects as "surprisingly elegant". Paul Cornell, Martin Day and Keith Topping, authors of The Guinness Book of Classic British TV, view the effects as more "realistic" than those of earlier Anderson series. Though judging many of the episodes to be "predictable and corny", they add that the series' "knowingness" and "love of character [...] made the whole thing charming." Sangster and Condon describe the episodes as "mercifully shorter" than those of Thunderbirds, creating "tighter plotting and an engaging simplicity". The music has also been praised: Glenn Erickson describes it as "corny retro" appropriate to the series' tone, while Clark calls it the "best underwater adventure music ever written".

Some commentators have been critical of the puppetry and effects. Paul Mavis of DVD Talk writes that the use of aquaria makes the underwater scenes look "a tad creaky" but believes that they compare well to contemporary feature film effects. Erickson writes that as in other Supermarionation series, the puppets' lack of mobility makes scenes feel "rather static". He notes that this limitation forces a large amount of movement to be kept off-screen: "Almost every capture by Aquaphibians ellipses difficult-to-film interaction, skipping straight to static talking scenes instead."

Sangster and Condon argue that, while Stingray is mainly for children, it was also the first Anderson series to have adult appeal. According to Jon E. Lewis and Penny Stempel, authors of Cult TV: The Essential Critical Guide, the series combines "kiddie-time exciting narrative action" with imaginative spoofs for the "more sophisticated". Stingray has also attracted a variety of comment on its presentation of race and sex. Newman argues that through its use of "silver- and green-skinned" undersea villains and the "odd caricatured Arab baddie", Stingray, like Thunderbirds, conveys "square, almost 1950s" attitudes towards race. Mavis rejects claims of racism, noting that not all of the series' underwater beings are malevolent and that this is acknowledged in character dialogue. Nicholas J. Cull views the mute Marina as an example of a female Anderson character who is "subordinate" to men, while Erickson argues that Atlanta's role as an assistant makes her a gender stereotype. Erickson also writes that the love triangle between Atlanta, Troy and Marina (which Blair describes as an "unusual development" for a children's series) creates a "mild sexist tension". Mavis disagrees that the series is sexist, noting that while Atlanta "doesn't do much here except answer the phone", Marina saves Troy's life on several occasions.

Cold War analysis
Cull observes that in its depiction of the WASP, Stingray is one of several Gerry Anderson series that "assume the development of world government and world security institutions" and "reflect the 1960s vogue for stories set in secret organisations with extravagant acronyms." He compares the premise of the series to the Cold War, noting the conflict between the WASP and the undersea races and the latter's use of spies to infiltrate human society. He believes that the episode "Marineville Traitor", which focuses on a hunt for an "enemy within", has an "especially strong Cold War flavour". Cull also notes that while the Anderson productions often present nuclear technology as a threat, Stingray also shows it in a positive light: for example, the series' eponymous submarine is nuclear-powered.

Sarah Kurchak of The A.V. Club suggests that compared to villains of earlier Anderson series, Titan and the Aquaphibians serve as a "more classically Cold War-style villainous Other". She adds that in the world of Stingray, "the battle lines between land and sea are clearly defined, the enemy is always watching, and the target of their aggression is always close to home." Kurchak also suggests that through his "multiple nightmares" about threats to Marineville, Troy embodies Cold War anxieties. O'Brien writes that Stingray contains "more than a touch of the Cold War ethos", arguing that Titan "could have easily belonged to an underwater branch of the Soviet Bloc."

Tie-insStingray was featured in the Supermarionation tie-in comic TV Century 21 (later known as TV21) from its first issue, published by City Magazines/AP Films (Merchandising) in January 1965. The Stingray strip ran from TV Century 21 #1 (23 Jan. 1965) to TV21 #189 (30 Aug. 1968); it was originally by Alan Fennell & Ron Embleton; later contributors included Dennis Hooper, Gerry Embleton, and Michael Strand. The Stingray comics were reprinted in Polystyle Publications' Countdown in the years 1971–1972.

The 1960s also saw the publication of two original novels by Armada Books: Stingray and Stingray and the Monster, written by John William Jennison under the pseudonym "John Theydon".

Audio plays
To supplement the TV episodes, in 1965 APF's sister company Century 21 Records released three audio plays in the form of 7-inch vinyl EP records. Originally marketed as "mini-albums", these feature the voice cast from the TV series and are each about 21 minutes long. They are included as special features on the UK Stingray DVD box set.

Anderson Entertainment, in association with audio drama production company Big Finish, produced adaptations of the original novels, Stingray as Operation Icecap and Stingray and the Monster as Monster from the Deep.

See also
List of early colour TV shows in the UK

Footnotes and references
 Explanatory footnotes 

 Citations 

 General and cited references 
 
 Originally published as: 
 
 
 
 
 
 
 
 
 
 
 
 Stingray'' volume originally published separately as:

External links
 
 

 
1960s British children's television series
British children's science fiction television series
1960s British science fiction television series
1964 British television series debuts
1965 British television series endings
British children's action television series
British children's adventure television series
British television shows featuring puppetry
English-language television shows
Fictional works set in the Pacific Ocean
First-run syndicated television programs in the United States
ITV children's television shows
Marionette films
Nautical television series
Submarines in fiction
Television series by ITC Entertainment
Television series set in the 2060s
Television series set on fictional islands
Television shows adapted into comics
Television shows adapted into novels
Television shows set in Washington, D.C.
Subterranean fiction
Underwater action films
Underwater civilizations in fiction